In the Eyes of Mr Fury  is a gay, coming-of-age, magic realist, mystery novel by Philip Ridley. It was Ridley's first novel to be published, previously having his novella Crocodilia released in 1988. It was also the first book published in the Penguin Books Originals imprint.

In 2015 It was announced that the novel was to be reissued by Valancourt Books along with Ridley's other gay themed literature for adults Crocodilia and Flamingoes in Orbit. It was later revealed in 2016 that the novel had been fully revised by Ridley and is almost double the length of the original edition, with Valancourt Books stating on their website that "Ridley has reimagined the story, expanding the original short novel into the world’s first LGBT magical realist epic" and that the new edition is "a vast, labyrinthine, hall-of-mirrors saga... covering over a hundred years." This new edition was released on 6 December 2016 and later made into an audiobook that was released on iTunes and Audible in late 2017.

In Other Media

The song Fury Eyes from The Creatures' second album, Boomerang is dedicated to the novel.

References

1989 British novels
British LGBT novels
British magic realism novels
British mystery novels
Novels by Philip Ridley
British bildungsromans
1980s LGBT novels
Penguin Books books